NHS Scotland, sometimes styled NHSScotland, is the publicly funded healthcare system in Scotland and one of the four systems that make up the National Health Service in the United Kingdom. It operates 14 territorial NHS boards across Scotland, supported by seven special non-geographic health boards, and Public Health Scotland.

At the founding of the National Health Service in the United Kingdom, three separate institutions were created in Scotland, England and Wales and Northern Ireland. The NHS in Scotland was accountable to the Secretary of State for Scotland rather than the Secretary of State for Health as in England and Wales. Prior to 1948, a publicly funded healthcare system, the Highlands and Islands Medical Service, had been established in Scotland in 1913, recognising the geographical and demographic challenges of delivering healthcare in that region.

Following Scottish devolution in 1999, health and social care policy and funding became devolved to the Scottish Parliament. It is currently administered through the Health and Social Care Directorates of the Scottish Government.

The current Cabinet Secretary for Health and Social Care is Humza Yousaf, and the head of staff is the director-general health and social care and chief executive of NHS Scotland, Caroline Lamb.

Budget
NHS Scotland had an operating budget of £15.3billion in 2020/21.

Health and social care are devolved issues in the United Kingdom and the separate public healthcare bodies of Scotland, England and Wales are each commonly referred to as "National Health Service". The NHS in Scotland was created as an administratively separate organisation in 1948 under the ministerial oversight of the Scottish Office, before being politically devolved in 1999. This separation of powers and financing is not always apparent to the general public due to the co-ordination and co-operation where cross-border emergency care is involved.

Workforce

Approximately 160,000 staff work across 14 regional NHS Boards, seven Special NHS Boards and one public health body, More than 12,000 of these healthcare staff are engaged under independent contractor arrangements. Descriptions of staff numbers can be expressed as headcount and by Whole-Time Equivalent (WTE) which is an estimate that helps to take account of full and part-time work patterns.

Scotland's healthcare workforce includes:
 around 67,000 nurses, midwives and health visitors (providing around 58,000 WTE)
 over 4,900 consultants (providing around 4600 WTE)
 more than 4,800 general practitioners (providing around 3,700 WTE)
 more than 500 nurse practitioners and 1,600 registered nurses working in GP surgeries.
 dentists
 around 4,000 pharmacists, mostly working in community pharmacy positions, with around 1,200 retail pharmacies across Scotland.
 opticians
 allied health professionals
 Healthcare scientists play an important role in the prevention, diagnosis and treatment of a wide range of medical conditions, as well as in rehabilitation. Healthcare science staff are essential members of the healthcare team. 
 administrators, clerical and domestic staff.

Origins and history

Before 1948

Prior to the creation of NHS in Scotland in 1948, the state was involved with the provision of healthcare, though it was not universal. Half of Scotland's landmass was already covered by the Highlands and Islands Medical Service, a state-funded health system run directly from Edinburgh, which had been set up 35 years earlier to address a deficiency in the panel system, which required workers who earned less than £160 per year to pay 4d per week.  Fourpence per week was beyond the means of most crofters at the time, who were subsistence farmers but often provided many troops for British armed forces. Average crofting families' income in some areas could be as low as £26 per annum (10/- or 120d per week) or even lower. The additional challenges of delivering medical care in the sparsely populated highlands and islands with poor infrastructure were also funded by the Highlands and Islands Medical Service.

During the Second World War, the Emergency Hospital Service (Scotland) built many hospitals intended to treat wartime casualties and injuries. These hospitals initially lay idle and so the Scottish Secretary at the time decided to use the hospital capacity to reduce long waiting lists for treatment.

Scotland also had its own distinctive medical tradition, centred on its medical schools rather than private practice, and a detailed plan for the future of health provision based on the Cathcart report.

Development of a National Health Service
Following the publication of the Beveridge Report in 1942, the UK Government responded with a white paper, A National Health Service (Cmd. 6502) in 1944 led by the Conservative MP and Minister for Health Henry Willink. In its introduction, the white paper laid out the Government's intention to have the new health service operate in Scotland--

"The decision to establish the new service applies, of course, to Scotland as well as to England and Wales and the present Paper is concerned with both countries. The differing circumstances of Scotland are bound to involve certain differences of method and of organisation, although not of scope or of object ... Throughout the Paper references to the Minister should normally be construed as references to the Minister of Health in the case of England and Wales and the Secretary of State for Scotland in the case of Scotland."

Founding of the NHS in Scotland
The UK Parliament passed the National Health Service (Scotland) Act 1947, which came into effect on 5 July 1948. This foundational legislation has since been superseded.

This Act provided a uniform national structure for services which had previously been provided by a combination of the Highlands and Islands Medical Service, local government, charities and private organisations which in general was only free for emergency use. The new system was funded from central taxation and did not generally involve a charge at the time of use for services concerned with existing medical conditions or vaccinations carried out as a matter of general public health requirements; prescription charges were a later introduction in 1951.

Structure
 
Current provision of healthcare is the responsibility of 14 geographically based local NHS boards, seven national special health boards, supported by Public Health Scotland, plus many small contractors for primary care services. Hospitals, district nursing services and healthcare planning are managed by health boards. Government policy has been to use the National Waiting Times centre to address waiting lists and limit use of the private sector.

Primary Care
To have access to NHS services, patients should register with a General Practice. Most often this will be an independent contractor who has agreed to provide general medical services to patients, funded on a capitation basis, with weighting given for the age distribution, poverty, and rurality. Various services are provided free of charge by General Practitioners (GPs), who are responsible for maintaining a comprehensive medical record, usually affording some continuity of care. There is no option to self-refer to specialists in Scotland unlike many European countries. GP surgeries consist of partner GPs who are responsible for running the practice, and may include GPs employed by the practice and paid a salary, but who do not have any responsibility in running the surgery. In some instances, GPs are directly employed by the local health board, such as in parts of the Highlands and Islands.

The NHS in Scotland also covers dentistry for patients who have registered with a dentist who has agreed to provide services to NHS patients. Most dentists in Scotland have a mixture of NHS patients and private patients. Check-ups are free, however dentists charge patients a regulated fee. Patients in Scotland must pay up to 80% of the total cost of the treatment unless they qualify for free treatment or help with costs. Dentists are remunerated through a voucher towards treatment and patients can choose to have more expensive treatments if they are willing and able to do so. This is mostly commonly seen with dental amalgam restorations on molars, which are available on the NHS, whereas composite resin restorations are not. The patient 'opts-out' of the NHS treatment and pays for the composite restoration as temporary private patient, but remains an NHS patient for future checkups.

Community pharmacies in Scotland also provide prescribed medicines free of charge, where the patient is registered with a GP Surgery based in Scotland, and where the appropriate prescription-voucher is given. Like GPs, they are private providers who deliver NHS services under contract. Pharmacists are increasingly delivering services which were once the responsibilities of GPs, such as flu vaccinations as well as offering advice on skin problems, gastrointestinal problems and other minor illnesses. Pharmacies in Scotland are frequently located inside Chemists' shops and supermarkets. While there are no prescription charges in Scotland, prescription-vouchers are not ordinarily given in Scotland for certain medicines - such as acetominophen and ibuprofen - as these are available without a prescription at very low prices in most chemists and supermarkets.
 
Most optometrists in Scotland also provide NHS services, and provide eye examinations, which includes retinal health checks and other eye screening services in addition to sight tests. Entitlements are mainly for corrective lenses and a predetermined set of frames - which were once known as 'NHS glasses' which attracted some social stigma until the range of frames was extended.

Secondary Care
 
Hospital services are delivered directly by the National Health Service in Scotland. Since devolution, Scottish healthcare policy has been to move away from market-based solutions and towards direct delivery, rather than using the private or voluntary sectors. Proposals for the establishment of fifteen NHS boards were announced by the Scottish Executive Health Department in December 2000. Further details about the role and function of the unified NHS health boards were provided in May 2001. From 1 October 2001 each geographical health board area had a single NHS board that was responsible for improving health and health services across their local area, replacing the previous decision-making structures of 43 separate boards and trusts.

In April 2004, Scotland's health care system became an integrated service under the management of NHS boards. Local authority nominees were added to board membership to improve co-ordination of health and social care. The remaining 16 Trusts were dissolved from 1 April 2004. Hospitals are now managed by the acute division of the NHS board. Primary care services such as GPs and pharmacies would continue to be contracted through the NHS board, but from 2004 were considered part of the remit of Community Health Partnerships (CHPs), structures based largely on local authority boundaries and including local authority membership of their boards. By April 2014, there were new joint working arrangements in place between the NHS boards and local authorities came into effect that also included responsibility for social care. There new organisations, which took over from CHPs are called Health and Social Care Partnerships (HSCPs).

In 2021 a new national Centre for Sustainable Delivery was established to bring together national programmes for scheduled and unscheduled care, waiting times and best practice – and ensure health boards are implementing them.

Regional health boards 
There are 14 regional health boards.
According to projections from 2019 National Records of Scotland census data, the 2021 population sizes of the regional health boards were estimated to be:

NHS Argyll and Clyde now no longer operates. Its responsibilities were shared between NHS Highland and NHS Greater Glasgow on 1 April 2006, and the latter was renamed NHS Greater Glasgow and Clyde. The part of the NHS Argyll and Clyde area which transferred to NHS Highland corresponds to the Argyll and Bute council area.

Elections to health boards

In January 2008, the Scottish Government announced plans for legislation to bring in direct elections as a way to select people for non-executive positions on health boards. The Health Committee of the Scottish Parliament had supported plans for directly elected members as a way that might improve public representation. This plan was abandoned in 2013 after trials in Fife and Dumfries and Galloway resulted in low voter turnout.

Special health boards
Local health boards are supported by seven national special health boards providing national services, some of which have further publicised subdivisions, including:

Healthcare Improvement Scotland
Scottish Ambulance Service (The single public emergency ambulance service in Scotland)
The Golden Jubilee University National Hospital is a special NHS Board in Scotland with the purpose of reducing waiting times using a single modern hospital located at Clydebank. It was previously a private sector hospital built at a cost of £180 million, but was bought in 2002 by the Scottish Executive for £37.5 million after it failed to produce a profit despite being established with the help of a subsidy provided by a previous government.
The State Hospitals Board for Scotland is responsible for the secure psychiatric hospital at Carstairs, which provides high security services for mentally disordered offenders and others who pose a high risk to themselves or others.
NHS 24 runs a telephone advice and triage service that cover the out of hours period, more recently also providing a national telehealth service.
NHS Education for Scotland (training and e-library)
NHS National Services Scotland It is the common name for the Common Services Agency (CSA) providing services for NHS Scotland boards.

The seven boards are supported by Public Health Scotland, which is responsible for public health, including national health protection, and health education from April 2020)

NHS Health Scotland, Health Protection Scotland and Information Services Division were succeeded by Public Health Scotland in April 2020. This new agency is a collaborative approach by both the Scottish Government and COSLA as a result of the Public Health Reform Programme.

Links with the NHS in England

The NHS in Scotland does have some services provided by the NHS in England - such as NHS Business Services Authority, which processes the payment of dental, optical and pharmacy vouchers and negotiates with pharmaceutical suppliers to negotiate prices per-item down. The costs for the medicines consumed is borne by the health board that patient's GP surgery is based in. Some very complex, low volume, highly-specialist hospital services are also provided by NHS Trusts in England, such as the Hospital for Tropical Diseases in London. These Trusts  also treat patients from healthcare systems outside the UK.

Representative Bodies

The Mental Welfare Commission for Scotland is an independent statutory body which protects people with a psychological disorder who are not able to look after their own interests. It is funded through the Scottish Government Health & Social Care Directorate, and follows the same financial framework as the NHS in Scotland.

The Scottish Health Council took over from local Health Councils on 31 March 2005.

Quality of Healthcare 

Regulation of most medical practitioners is a reserved matter, with doctors regulated by the General Medical Council of the United Kingdom, Nurses by the Nursing and Midwifery Council, Dentists, Dental Therapists, Dental Hygienists, Dental Technicians and Dental Nurses by the General Dental Council, Optometrists by the General Optical Council, pharmacists by the General Pharmaceutical Council, and allied health professionals by the Health and Care Professions Council.

Inspection of premises is undertaken by Healthcare Environment Inspectorate and the Care Inspectorate.

There are separate institutions, independent of government such as Academy of Medical Royal Colleges and Faculties in Scotland, the Royal College of Physicians of Edinburgh, the Royal College of Surgeons of Edinburgh, and the Royal College of Physicians and Surgeons of Glasgow which are distinct from their counterparts elsewhere in the United Kingdom which support professionals in Scotland.

Other divisions

Other subdivisions of the Scottish NHS include:-

 Health Protection Scotland (Part of NHS National Services Scotland responsible for health protection until April 2020  
 Public Health Scotland, responsible for public health protection in Scotland since April 2020
 Scottish National Blood Transfusion Service

Test and Protect

During the COVID-19 pandemic, NHS Scotland established Test & Protect as the national contact tracing service to minimise the spread of the virus within Scotland.

Central Register

The Central Register keeps records of patients resident in Scotland who have been registered with any of the health systems of the United Kingdom. It is maintained by the Registrar General. Its purposes include keeping GPs' patient lists up to date, the control of new NHS numbers issued in Scotland and assisting with medical research.

Patient identification
Scottish patients are identified using a ten-digit number known as the CHI Number. These are used to uniquely identify individuals, avoiding problems such as where health records of people with similar birth dates and names may be confused, or where ambiguously spelled or abbreviated names may lead to one patient having several different health records. In addition, CHI numbers are quoted in all clinical correspondence to ensure that there is no uncertainty over the patient in question. A similar system of NHS reference numbers has since been instituted by NHS England and Wales.

Recent developments
In 2000, the NHS boards were starting to help out researchers with their studies. The Scottish Dental Practice Board, for example, was helping out a study which looked at the significance of orthodontic treatment with fixed appliances. The SDPB shared 128 subjects with these researchers for analysis.

The SNP government, elected in May 2007, made it clear that it opposed the use of partnerships between the NHS and the private sector. Health Secretary Nicola Sturgeon voiced opposition to what she termed the "creeping privatisation" of the NHS, and called an end to the use of public money to help the private sector "compete" with the NHS.

In September 2008, the Scottish Government announced that parking charges at hospitals were to be abolished except 3 where the car parks were managed under a private finance initiative scheme:

Ninewells Hospital, Dundee
The Royal Infirmary of Edinburgh
Glasgow Royal Infirmary

Prescription charges were abolished in Scotland in 2011.  Alex Neil defended the abolition in 2017 saying that restoring the charge would be a false economy, "Given that it costs on average £4,500 per week to keep patients in an acute hospital in Scotland, it's actually cheaper to keep them at home and give them the drugs to prevent them going into hospital."

Initiatives
The National Health Service and Community Care Act 1990 introduced GP fundholding for certain elective procedures on a voluntary basis. Fundholding gave GPs significant influence over Trusts' decision making as a significant source of funding. GP Fundholding was subsequently abolished with the function transferring to Primary Care Trusts in 1998.

In 2001, NHS 24, was established to provide advice and triage services for patients outside of the 'core hours' of 08:0018:30 on any working day. They can also advise of pharmacy opening hours.

In 2002, the Scottish Parliament Acted to introduce free personal care for patients aged over 65 in Community Care and Health (Scotland) Act 2002

The Scottish Parliament abolished Primary Care Trusts in the National Health Service Reform (Scotland) Act 2004, which abolished the internal market in Scotland and replaced NHS Trusts with 15 territorial health boards. In 2004, GPs were no longer required to provide out of hours services unless they opted into doing so.

In 2005, a plan for improving oral health and modernising dental practices was put into place, known as 'Childsmile', which provides preventive care such as proper brushing technique, tooth varnish and dietary advice. This has resulted in 60% of children in Scotland having no obvious signs of tooth decay.

An incentive programme for GPs was established in 2004, known as the Quality and Outcomes Framework (QOF) were introduced in order to reward and incentivize good practice and provided a way for GP surgeries to increase their income. This was abolished in Scotland in 2015 as QOF compliance was a significant administrative burden for GPs. 
The Scottish Government and the British Medical Association agreed the 2018 Scottish General Medical Services Contract that came in to force 1 April 2018.

In 2008, the Scottish Government introduced the Scottish Patient Safety Programme, which aimed to reduced iatrogenic illness by changing the safety culture to be more in line with the aviation industry, by providing clinicians with skills in improvement methodology and root cause analysis.

In 2022 an extra £82.6million was announced to bolster pharmacy support for repeat prescriptions and medication reviews in GP practices.  The same year, NHS Scotland recruited 191 nurses from overseas. The nurses were recruited from several countries, including India and Philippines. A plan was made to hire another 203 foreign nurses through recruitment agencies.  A contract was awarded to Inhealthcare for remote monitoring services across Scotland. This will enable patients to record relevant information at home and relay the readings to NHS teams for analysis using a mobile app or landline telephone.  It will be used to manage  hypertension, chronic obstructive pulmonary disease, asthma, heart disease, diabetes, depression, malnutrition, cancer and COVID.

There is a substantial effort to develop a drone delivery service. The University of Strathclyde, NHS Grampian, NATS Holdings, AGS Airports and other partners form a consortium, Care and Equity – Healthcare Logistics UAS Scotland known as ‘CAELUS‘ which has designed drone landing stations for NHS sites across Scotland and developed a virtual model of the proposed delivery network.  It is testing whether drones will improve logistics services, including the transport of laboratory samples, blood products, chemotherapy and medicines.  It is hoped that this will provide equity of care between urban and remote rural communities. At present patients in remote areas may have to travel for hours to reach a hospital able to provide specialised treatment. Skyports, a drone operator, is running flight trials and live flights should start in 2023.

Performance
In 2014 the Nuffield Trust and the Health Foundation produced a report comparing the performance of the NHS in the four countries of the UK since devolution in 1999. They included data for the North East of England as an area more similar to the devolved areas than the rest of England. They found that there was little evidence that any one country was moving ahead of the others consistently across the available indicators of performance. There had been improvements in all four countries in life expectancy and in rates of mortality amenable to health care.  Despite the hotly contested policy differences between the four countries there was little evidence, where there was comparable data, of any significant differences in outcomes. The authors also complained about the increasingly limited set of comparable data on the four health systems of the UK.

In 20142015 more than 7,500 NHS patients were treated in private hospitals in order to meet waiting times targets.

Dr Peter Bennie, of the British Medical Association, attacked the decision to release weekly reports on the Accident and Emergency 4 hour wait target in June 2015. In June 2015 92.2% of patients were admitted or discharged within 4 hours against a target of 95%. He said "The publication of these weekly statistics completely misses the point and diverts attention from the real issues in our health service."

The Academy of Medical Royal Colleges and Faculties in Scotland produced a report entitled "Learning from serious failings in care" in July 2015. The report found the problems had been predominantly caused by the failure of clinical staff and NHS management to work together. They found leadership and accountability were often lacking but bullying was endemic. Their  20 recommendations for improvements in the NHS included a set of minimum safe staffing levels for consultants, doctors, nurses and other staff in hospital settings. They criticised a target driven culture, saying:  "Quality care must become the primary influence on patient experience... and the primary indicator of performance."

In January 2017 the British Medical Association said that the health service in Scotland was "stretched pretty much to breaking point" and needed an increase in funding of at least 4% "just to stand still". The service missed seven out of eight performance targets in 20162017.  There was a 99% increase in the number of people waiting more than 12 weeks for an outpatient appointment.  Drug-related deaths were the highest in the European Union.

NHS Scotland's local health boards also have high vacancy levels in their mental health departments. In 2020, it was revealed that over 1 in 8 senior mental health roles were unfilled, which has directly led to increased waiting times for mental health patients.

In November 2022 a survey by Ipsos and the Health Foundation found just 28% of the Scottish public were confident about their devolved government plans for the NHS.

Anglo-Scottish Border issues
The divergent administration of the NHS between England and Scotland has created problems for patients who live close to the border. The Coldstream medical practice has about 1400 patients who live in England. They benefit from the Scottish free prescriptions because they are "deemed to be in the Scottish healthcare system" so long as they are delivered through a Scottish pharmacy. However, there has been no agreement about the reimbursement of hospital charges for patients who cross the border for hospital treatment. In 2013, 633 Northumberland patients crossed into Scotland for treatment at the Borders General Hospital.

University College London Hospitals NHS Foundation Trust complained in June 2015 that commissioners outside England use a "burdensome" prior approval process, where a funding agreement is needed before each stage of treatment.  At the end of 2014–15 the trust was owed more than £2.3m for treating patients from outside England. A survey by the Health Service Journal suggested there was £21m of outstanding debt relating to patients from the devolved nations treated in the last three years, against total invoicing of £315m by English NHS trusts.  Funding was approved for 625 referrals outside Scotland in 20162017, up from 427 in 20132014. The cost rose from £11.9million in 20132014 to £15.2million in 20162017.

Overseas patients
Patients who are not entitled to free NHS treatment because they are not ordinarily resident in the UK are supposed to pay for their treatment.  Not all of this money is collected.  £347,089 was owed to NHS Lothian by 28 patients in 20162017, compared with £47,755 owed by fewer than five patients the previous year.  In Greater Glasgow and Clyde the number of overseas patients treated rose from 67 in 20142015 to 99. A total of £423,326 is owed to the health board and about £1.2million across Scotland.

See also
 NHS Research Scotland
 Social care in Scotland
 List of hospitals in Scotland
 Voluntary Health Scotland

References

External links 

 
Our NHS Scotland website celebrating 65 years of health care

 
1948 establishments in Scotland
Government agencies established in 1948
Organisations based in Edinburgh